Graphium anthedon is a butterfly of the family Papilionidae, that is found in the Sunda Islands in the Malay Archipelago.

Subspecies
G. a. anthedon
G. a. milon (C. & R. Felder, 1865) (Sulawesi, Talaud, Kabaena, Buton, Banggai)
G. a. coelius (Fruhstorfer, 1899) (Sula)

Taxonomy
Treated as a full species by Vane-Wright, R. I., & R. de. Jong. 2003. The butterflies of Sulawesi: annotated checklist for a critical island fauna. Zoologische Verhandlingen 343: 1-267.

The history of this taxon is complex and related to that of Graphium milon Felder & Felder, 1865. Originally described as Papilio Latr. species anthedon Felder & Felder, 1864 and later seen as a synonym of Papilio sarpedon Linn., 1764 by Kirby (1871: 559). Treated as a subspecies of Graphium (Graphium) sarpedon (Linnaeus, 1758) by Fujioka and Nishiyama (1997: 189). Also treated as a subspecies of Graphium milon (C. & R. Felder, 1865).

Graphium milon has an interwoven history. Originally described as Papilio milon Felder & Felder, 1865 it was also seen as a synonym of Papilio sarpedon Linn., 1764 by Kirby (1871: 559). Treated as a subspecies of Graphium sarpedon Linnaeus, 1758 by D'Abrera (1982: 98) and treated as a species of Graphium by Tsukada and Nishiyama (1982: 379). Finally ranked as a subspecies of Graphium (Graphium) anthedon Felder & Felder, 1864 by Vane-Wright & de Jong (2003: 92).

References
Tsukada, E. & Nishiyama, Y. 1982. Papilionidae. In: Tsukada, E. (ed): Butterflies of the South East Asian Islands. Volume 1. Plapac Co., Tokyo

External links

The Global Butterfly Information System - Images and text

Butterflies described in 1864
anthedon
Butterflies of Malaysia
Taxa named by Baron Cajetan von Felder
Taxa named by Rudolf Felder